The 2010 ICC World Cricket League Division One was a cricket tournament which took place in July 2010 in the Netherlands. It formed part of the World Cricket League competition administered by the International Cricket Council, the international governing body for cricket.

Division One, which is the successor to the now defunct ICC 6 Nations Challenge, is the highest tier of the World Cricket League, and is effectively the second level of one-day cricket for national teams below the 10 Test-playing nations. All teams competing in the 2010 Division One tournament qualified for the climax of the World Cricket League, the 2013 ICC World Cup Qualifier.

The competition was won by Ireland (who as winners of the 2009 ICC World Cup Qualifier were de facto reigning champions), defeating Scotland in the final, thus ending the tournament unbeaten.

Teams
The following six teams have One Day International status.

ACA (1)
 
ACA (1)
 

ACC (1)
 

ECC (3)
 
  (Hosts)

Squads
 * – Withdrawn Player.

Fixtures

Group stage

Points table

Matches

Playoffs

5th place playoff

3rd place playoff

Final

References

External links
 Tournament home at ESPNcricinfo

2010, 1